Admiral Marsetio (born 3 December 1956) was a former Chief of Naval Staff who served from 17 December 2012 to 31 December 2014 after being inaugurated by President Susilo Bambang Yudhoyono until 31 December 2014. He was then replaced by Admiral Ade Supandi.

Career
He graduated from the AAL-33 TA Naval Academy in 1981. He has served various assignments both on warships and on staff.

Marsetio was the best graduate of AAL Bumimoro, Surabaya, in 1981. Prior to serving as the number one in the navy, the doctoral graduate from Gajah Mada University served as Deputy KASAL (WAKASAL).

In the midst of his busy service, Marsetio still finds time to share knowledge and knowledge, including as a lecturer at the Naval War College USA, at the Naval Command and Staff College, at Sesko TNI, at Lemhannas, as well as a lecturer at various universities, including at the College of Education. Naval Technology (STTAL), Indonesian Defense University (Unhan), University of Indonesia, Gadjah Mada University, Diponegoro University, and Raja Ali Haji Maritime University (Umrah) Tanjung Pinang, as well as Hang Tuah University Surabaya and Widya Mandala Catholic University Surabaya.

Position 

 DPB of KRI Fatahillah (1981)
 Assistant Panagi of KRI Fatahillah (1982)
 Commissioned Communication Officer of KRI Nala (1984)
 Commissioned Executor Officer of KRI Layang (1985)
 Head of Division of PIT KRI Slamet Riyadi (1986)
 Head of Artillery Division of PS KRI Slamet Riyadi (1989)
 Head of Artillery Division of KRI Slamet Riyadi (1990)
 Head of Operations Department of KRI Nala (1991)
 Supervisory Officer of Motir Armatim (1992)
 Executing Officer of KRI Karel Satsuit Tubun (1995)
 Commander of KRI Sultan Thaha Syaifuddin (1995)
 Commissioned Officer of Mako Koarmabar (Dik Seskoal) (1996)
 Commissioned Operations Staff of Koarmabar (1998)
 Commander of KRI Nala (1998)
 Commander of KRI Ahmad Yani (1999)
 Commissioned Staff of Ahli Pangarmatim "D" Manajemen (2001)
 Head of Depjiastra Seskoal (2001)
 Commissioned Officer of Pembantu V Sops Kasal (2002)
 Commander of Kolata Armatim (2003)
 Operation Assistant of Koarmatim (2003)
 Commissioned Staff of Ahli Pangarmatim "E" Teknologi (2004)
 Head of Staff of Guspurla Koarmatim (2004)
 Representative of Asrena Kasal (2006)
 Commander of Lantamal IV/Tanjungpinang (2007)
 Representative Assistant of Operasi Kasum TNI (2008)
 Commander of Kolinlamil (2009)
 Commander of Koarmabar (2009)
 Representative of Kasal (2010—2012)
 Kasal (2012—2014)
 Professor of Universitas Pertahanan (2018)

See also
Indonesian military ranks

References

1956 births
Living people
Indonesian admirals
People from Jakarta
Chiefs of Staff of the Indonesian Navy